Martina Navratilova was the defending champion and won in the final 5–7, 6–1, 6–0 against Tracy Austin.

Seeds
A champion seed is indicated in bold text while text in italics indicates the round in which that seed was eliminated. The top eight seeds received a bye to the second round.

  Martina Navratilova (champion)
  Andrea Jaeger (semifinals)
  Tracy Austin (final)
  Bettina Bunge (semifinals)
  Hana Mandlíková (second round)
  Sylvia Hanika (quarterfinals)
  Barbara Potter (third round)
  Virginia Ruzici (quarterfinals)
  Zina Garrison (third round)
  Kathy Rinaldi (second round)
  Bonnie Gadusek (third round)
  Andrea Temesvári (quarterfinals)
  Rosalyn Fairbank (first round)
  Claudia Kohde-Kilsch (second round)
 n/a
 n/a

Draw

Finals

Top half

Section 1

Section 2

Bottom half

Section 3

Section 4

References
 1983 Family Circle Cup Draw (Archived 2009-08-11)

Singles